Nduduzo Mfoza (born 14 March 1997) is a South African cricketer. He made his Twenty20 debut for KwaZulu-Natal Inland in the 2017 Africa T20 Cup on 15 September 2017. He made his first-class debut for KwaZulu-Natal Inland in the 2017–18 Sunfoil 3-Day Cup on 23 November 2017. He made his List A debut for KwaZulu-Natal Inland in the 2017–18 CSA Provincial One-Day Challenge on 26 November 2017.

In September 2018, he was named in KwaZulu-Natal Inland's squad for the 2018 Africa T20 Cup.

References

External links
 

1997 births
Living people
South African cricketers
KwaZulu-Natal Inland cricketers
Place of birth missing (living people)